In England, Sites of Special Scientific Interest (SSSIs) are designated by Natural England, which is responsible for protecting England's natural environment. Designation as an SSSI gives legal protection to the most important wildlife and geological sites. As of May 2019, there are 62 Sites of Special Scientific Interest in the county,  52 of which have been designated for their biological interest, 8 for their geological interest, and 2 for both biological and geological interest.

Surrey is a county in South East England. It is bordered by Greater London, Kent, East Sussex, West Sussex, Hampshire and Berkshire. Its top level of government is provided by Surrey County Council and the lower level by eleven boroughs and districts, Elmbridge, Epsom and Ewell, Guildford, Mole Valley, Reigate and Banstead, Runnymede, Spelthorne, Surrey Heath, Tandridge, Waverley and Woking.

Fourteen sites are also Special Protection Areas, six are Special Areas of Conservation, six are Ramsar sites, eleven are Nature Conservation Review sites, ten are Geological Conservation Review sites, twelve are local nature reserves, three are national nature reserves and one is on the Register of Historic Parks and Gardens. Five include scheduled monuments and twenty-six are managed by the Surrey Wildlife Trust.

Key

Interest
B = site of biological interest
G = site of geological interest

Public access
FP = access to footpaths through the site only
No = no public access to site
PP = public access to part of site
Yes = public access to all or most of the site

Other classifications
GCR = Geological Conservation Review site
LNR = Local nature reserve
NCR = Nature Conservation Review site
NNR = National nature reserve
Ramsar = Ramsar site, an internationally important wetland site
RHPG = Register of Historic Parks and Gardens of Special Historic Interest in England
SAC = Special Area of Conservation
SM = Scheduled monument
SPA = Special Protection Area under the European Union Directive on the Conservation of Wild Birds
SWT = Surrey Wildlife Trust

Sites

See also

List of Local Nature Reserves in Surrey
Surrey Wildlife Trust

Notes

References

Sources

External links
Surrey County Council map

 
Surrey
Sites of Special Scientific Interest